CSTA may refer to:

 California Science Teachers Association
 Canadian Seed Trade Association
 Center for SCREEN-TIME Awareness
Combat Systems Test Activity, Aberdeen Proving Ground, Maryland
 Community of Scientific and Technological Activities , a student activity in faculty of pharmacy Helwan university.
 Computer Science Teachers Association
 Computer-supported telecommunications applications
 Constant Slope Timed Automata
 Council of Science and Technology Advisors - a Canadian S&T Committee
 Cystatin A, a protein
 Czech and Slovak Transatlantic Award
 Peptide Transporter Carbon Starvation Family, a family of transporter proteins